The following are the national records in athletics in Paraguay maintained by its national athletics federation: Federación Paraguaya de Atletismo (FPA).

Outdoor

Key to tables:

+ = en route to a longer distance

h = hand timing

Mx = mark was made in a mixed race

OT = oversized track

# = not recognised by IAAF

A = high altitude

Men

Women

Indoor

Men

Women

Notes

References
General
Paraguayan Outdoor Records 12 December 2020 updated
Specific

External links
FPA web site

Paraguay
Records
Athletics